Spichikha is a rural locality (a village) in Kharovskoye Rural Settlement, Kharovsky District, Vologda Oblast, Russia. The population was 12 as of 2002.

Geography 
Spichikha is located 5 km east of Kharovsk (the district's administrative centre) by road. Klepestikha is the nearest rural locality.

References 

Rural localities in Kharovsky District